Matti Henrikki Järvinen (18 February 1909 – 22 July 1985) was a Finnish javelin thrower. He won the Olympic gold medal at the 1932 Summer Olympics ahead of two other Finns, Matti Sippala and Eino Penttilä, with a throw of 72.71 metres. Four of his other five throws would also have been enough to take gold. The three Finns did not take off their tracksuit trousers during the event.

Besides his Olympic gold, Järvinen is remembered for his numerous world records. From 1930 to 1936, he broke the javelin throw world record a record ten times in a row. He also became the European champion in 1934, setting a new world record with 76.66 m, and defended his title successfully in 1938. In the 1936 Summer Olympics, Järvinen finished fifth. Järvinen continued throwing after World War II, recording a 71.70-metre throw in 1945.

Järvinen was the son of Verner Järvinen, an Olympic bronze medalist in discus throw. His brother Akilles Järvinen was a decathlon world record holder and two-time Olympic silver medalist. His other brother Kalle was a shot putter and also an Olympian.

The exact distance of his gold-winning throw, 72.71 metres, was used as the height of the Helsinki Olympic Stadium in commemoration of his achievement.

World War II and after
In 1939 Järvinen, with his fellow javelin thrower Yrjö Nikkanen, served together on the Karelian Isthmus, where they trained soldiers in throwing hand grenades. After the War he became a noted economic councillor.

World records

References

1909 births
1955 deaths
Sportspeople from Tampere
People from Häme Province (Grand Duchy of Finland)
Finnish male javelin throwers
Olympic athletes of Finland
Olympic gold medalists for Finland
Athletes (track and field) at the 1932 Summer Olympics
Athletes (track and field) at the 1936 Summer Olympics
World record setters in athletics (track and field)
European Athletics Championships medalists
Medalists at the 1932 Summer Olympics
Olympic gold medalists in athletics (track and field)
Finnish military personnel of World War II
20th-century Finnish people